Malenko (Маленко) is a Slavic surname.

It may refer to:

 Aleksandar Malenko (born 1979) Macedonian swimmer
 Boris Malenko (1933-1994, born Lawrence J. Simon; aka ; ringname The Great Malenko) U.S. pro-wrestler
 Carl Malenko (born 1970, as Carl Ognibene) U.S. pro-wrestler
 Dean Malenko (born 1960, as Dean Simon) U.S. pro-wrestler
 Joe Malenko (born 1956, as Jody Simon) U.S. pro-wrestler

See also